In Greek mythology, Palaemon or Palaimon (Ancient Greek: Παλαίμων means 'wrestler') may refer to the following personages:

 Palaemon, the name that Melicertes, son of Athamas and Ino, received upon deification.
 Palaemon or Palaemonius, a Calydonian or Olenian Argonaut, son of either Hephaestus, Aetolus or Lernus. Since he was the son of the crippled god of smith, Palaemon had also crippled feet but no one among his comrades would dare to scorn his bodily frame and his valour.
 Palaemon, son of Heracles by either Autonoe, daughter of Pireus, or Iphinoe, daughter of Antaeus and Tinjis.
 Palaemon, a warrior in the army of the Seven Against Thebes who saw a chasm open in the earth and swallow Amphiaraus.
 Palaemon, a Trojan prince as son of King Priam of Troy.
 Palaemon, epithet of Heracles

Notes

References 

 Apollonius Rhodius, Argonautica translated by Robert Cooper Seaton (1853-1915), R. C. Loeb Classical Library Volume 001. London, William Heinemann Ltd, 1912. Online version at the Topos Text Project.
Apollonius Rhodius, Argonautica. George W. Mooney. London. Longmans, Green. 1912. Greek text available at the Perseus Digital Library.
Euripides, The Complete Greek Drama, edited by Whitney J. Oates and Eugene O'Neill, Jr. in two volumes. 1. Iphigenia in Tauris, translated by Robert Potter. New York. Random House. 1938. Online version at the Perseus Digital Library.
 Euripides, Euripidis Fabulae. vol. 2. Gilbert Murray. Oxford. Clarendon Press, Oxford. 1913. Greek text available at the Perseus Digital Library.
 Gaius Julius Hyginus, Fabulae from The Myths of Hyginus translated and edited by Mary Grant. University of Kansas Publications in Humanistic Studies. Online version at the Topos Text Project.
 Pausanias, Description of Greece with an English Translation by W.H.S. Jones, Litt.D., and H.A. Ormerod, M.A., in 4 Volumes. Cambridge, MA, Harvard University Press; London, William Heinemann Ltd. 1918. . Online version at the Perseus Digital Library
 Pausanias, Graeciae Descriptio. 3 vols. Leipzig, Teubner. 1903.  Greek text available at the Perseus Digital Library.
 Pseudo-Apollodorus, The Library with an English Translation by Sir James George Frazer, F.B.A., F.R.S. in 2 Volumes, Cambridge, MA, Harvard University Press; London, William Heinemann Ltd. 1921. . Online version at the Perseus Digital Library. Greek text available from the same website.
 Publius Ovidius Naso, Fasti translated by James G. Frazer. Online version at the Topos Text Project.
 Publius Ovidius Naso, Fasti. Sir James George Frazer. London; Cambridge, MA. William Heinemann Ltd.; Harvard University Press. 1933. Latin text available at the Perseus Digital Library.
 Publius Papinius Statius, The Thebaid translated by John Henry Mozley. Loeb Classical Library Volumes. Cambridge, MA, Harvard University Press; London, William Heinemann Ltd. 1928. Online version at the Topos Text Project.
 Publius Papinius Statius, The Thebaid. Vol I-II. John Henry Mozley. London: William Heinemann; New York: G.P. Putnam's Sons. 1928. Latin text available at the Perseus Digital Library.

Aetolian characters in Greek mythology
Boeotian characters in Greek mythology
Libyan characters in Greek mythology
Characters in Seven against Thebes